Abdul Lateef Akanni Hussain (1946 – 31 July 2022) was a Nigerian Physicist and educational administrator. He was the 6th substantive Vice-chancellor of the Lagos State University. 

Hussain died on 31 July 2022, at the age of 75.

Career
Hussain was The Vice-Chancellor of Lagos State University from 2005 to 2011. Previously he was the Dean of Faculty of Science at the University of Ibadan, Head of Department of Physics at University of Ibadan and Chairman of the University of Ibadan Muslim Community

References 

1946 births
2022 deaths
Academic staff of Lagos State University
Academic staff of the University of Ibadan
Vice-Chancellors of Nigerian universities